Damburneya matudae is a species of plant in the family Lauraceae.

It is endemic to Chiapas and Oaxaca states, located in southwestern Mexico.

References

matudae
Endemic flora of Mexico
Trees of Chiapas
Trees of Oaxaca
Taxonomy articles created by Polbot
Endangered flora of North America